WSO may stand for:
 Waltham Symphony Orchestra in Waltham, Massachusetts, United States
 Washabo Airport (IATA airport code) in Washabo, Suriname
 Weapon systems officer (or weapon systems operator), a flight officer in the U.S. Air Force, Navy and Marine Corps, and in the British Royal Air Force
 Wheeling Symphony Orchestra in Wheeling, West Virginia, United States
 Wichita Symphony Orchestra in Wichita, Kansas, United States
 Winnipeg Symphony Orchestra in Winnipeg, Manitoba, Canada
 World Safety Organization, an international professional association in safety
 World Sikh Organization, a non-profit organization
 White superficial onychomycosis, a fungal infection of the nail plate
 WSO, a malicious web shell